Da Hui may refer to :

Dahui Zonggao, a 12th-century Zen master
Da Hui, a song by the punk rock band "The Offspring" about an Oahu surfer group of the same name.